Thylacognathus is a genus of flies in the family Stratiomyidae.

Species
Thylacognathus lativentris (Wulp, 1898)

References

Stratiomyidae
Brachycera genera
Taxa named by Kálmán Kertész
Diptera of Australasia